Betta tomi is a species of gourami native to the Malaysian Peninsula where it is currently only found in Johor.  It previously also occurred in Singapore but has since been extirpated there.  It is an inhabitant of shallow streams that are shaded and have plenty of leaf litter and other debris.  This species grows to a length of  SL.

References

Endemic fauna of Malaysia
Freshwater fish of Malaysia
tomi
Taxa named by Maurice Kottelat
Fish described in 1994
Taxonomy articles created by Polbot